A zipper is a device for temporarily joining two edges of fabric together.

Zipper(s) may also refer to:

Entertainment
Zipper (film), a 2015 political thriller
Zipper (ride), an amusement ride
Zipper Harris, a character in the Doonesbury universe
Zipper Interactive, a video game developer
Zipper, a character in the Chip 'n Dale Rescue Rangers universe
"Zipper", a song by Brockhampton from Saturation III
The Zippers, a band

Transportation
Zenair Zipper, an ultralight aircraft
Zoe Zipper, a microcar sold by Zoe Motors in the early 1980s
Call sign for the airline Zip

Other uses
Zipper (BDSM), a sexual practice which involves "zipping" the skin
Zipper (data structure), a technique of representing an aggregate data structure
Zipper Creek (Alaska)
Zipper storage bag
.219 Zipper, a rifle cartridge made by Winchester Repeating Arms
Barrier transfer machine or zipper machine, used for moving concrete lane dividers
Herbert Zipper (1904–1997), Austrian composer, conductor and arts activist
Zipper Hall, a music venue on the campus of the Colburn School in Los Angeles, California
Operation Zipper, a Second World War British plan
Another name for a news ticker

See also
Zip (disambiguation)
Zipp (disambiguation)
Zippy (disambiguation)
Zipping (horse), an Australian champion racehorse